The 9th Rhythmic Gymnastics Asian Championships was held in Astana, Kazakhstan from 24 - 27 June 2017.

Medal winners

Medal table

References

Rhythmic Gymnastics Asian Championships
2017 in Kazakhstani sport
Gymnastics competitions in Kazakhstan
International gymnastics competitions hosted by Kazakhstan
2017 in gymnastics
Sport in Astana
June 2017 sports events in Kazakhstan